November is National Chronic Obstructive Pulmonary Disease (COPD) Awareness Month. Sponsored by the US COPD Coalition, the observance is a time for organizations and communities across the country to increase the overall awareness of COPD. COPD Learn More Breathe Better, the title of the National Heart, Lung, and Blood Institute’s national awareness and education campaign, has again been adopted as the theme for the most recent National COPD Awareness Month.

See also 

 List of environmental dates
 List of month-long observances

Sources
This article incorporates text from the National Institute of Mental Health, which is in the public domain.

External links 
About COPD Awareness Month

References 
November observances
Month-long observances
Awareness months

Observances in the United States